Ashbourne was a Rural District in Derbyshire, England from 1894 to 1974. It was created under the Local Government Act 1894.

It was enlarged in 1934 when Sudbury Rural District was abolished and amalgamated into the district.

The district was abolished in 1974 under the Local Government Act 1972 and combined with various other local government districts of western Derbyshire to form the new West Derbyshire district (subsequently renamed Derbyshire Dales).

References

Districts of England created by the Local Government Act 1894
Districts of England abolished by the Local Government Act 1972
History of Derbyshire
Rural districts of England